The Metro Suburban Conference (MSC) is an organization of Thirteen high schools in northern Illinois, representing seven communities in that part of the state. These high schools are all members of the Illinois High School Association. The conference began competing during the 2006–07 academic year, with four schools from the former Suburban Prairie Conference East Division.

Two new schools (Timothy Christian and Illiana Christian) were added for the 2009–10 academic year, both previously part of the Private School League.  Glenbard South High School was added for 2010–11 following the dissolution of the Western Sun Conference.

During the 2013-2014, seven former members of the Suburban Christian Conference decided to move to the MSC, effective during the 2014-2015 academic year. The remaining five high schools moved to either the Chicago Catholic League or the East Suburban Catholic Conference, effectively ended the SCC's run as one of Illinois' premier non-public athletic conferences.

In 2018-19, Glenbard South left the conferences to join the Upstate Eight Conference while, Aurora Christian, Bishop McNamara, Rosary, and St. Francis joins the conference. Starting in 2019-20, Westmont left the Interstate Eight Conference to join the MSC following with the departure of Fenton High School.

In 2020, Guerin College Preparatory High School permanently closed due to declining enrollment, need in financial aid for students, and lower fundraising.

In 2022, Rosary left the conference to join the Girls Catholic Athletic Conference.

Nine catholic schools are announcing to leave the conference starting in 2023-24 season: Aurora Christian, Bishop McNamara, Chicago Christian, Timothy Christian, St. Edward, and Wheaton Academy will form a new Chicagoland Christian Conference along with Marian Central Catholic, Christ the King, and Chicago Hope Academy while St. Francis, IC Catholic Prep, and Aurora Central Catholic will join the Chicago Catholic League

Membership

References

Illinois high school sports conferences